Tygo Gernandt (born 7 April 1974 in Amsterdam, North Holland) is a Dutch actor. He has played in several Dutch movies, among them Van God Los, Eilandgasten, Schnitzelparadijs and De Dominee. He also played in the BBC TV series The Last Kingdom.

Career
Gernandt won a Golden Calf award for his performance in the Dutch movie Van God Los.

In 2006 he voiced Proog in the short film Elephants Dream.

In 2014, he participated in the 14th season of the popular television show Wie is de Mol?. In 2020, he appeared in a special anniversary edition of the show, called Wie is de Mol? Renaissance, which featured only contestants of previous seasons.

Film

Television

References

External links
 Official site
 

1974 births
Dutch male actors
Dutch male film actors
Dutch male television actors
Dutch male voice actors
Living people
Male actors from Amsterdam
Golden Calf winners
21st-century Dutch male actors